A Talking Cat!?! is a 2013 American independent family comedy film directed by David DeCoteau.  The film was released direct to DVD on February 18, 2013, by Phase 4 Films and features Academy Award–nominated actor Eric Roberts as the voice of Duffy, the titular talking cat.

Synopsis
Duffy is a cat that is capable of talking to humans, but only once per individual. While out walking, he comes across two families, both led by single parents. The wealthy Phil Barber recently sold his computer company in order to spend more time with his son, who is largely indifferent about his dad's decision. He is more concerned about his crush on schoolmate Frannie, who has hired him as a tutor. Meanwhile, Susan is struggling to make ends meet as a caterer with her two children Tina and Trent.

Duffy speaks to each person giving advice on their lives and worries. He manages to help Chris get together with Frannie, give Trent the confidence and guidance for his future, and directs Tina to read about the sale of Phil's company. This guides Tina to approach Phil about a computer program she created. Duffy also advises Phil to begin taking walks outside, knowing that this will likely lead to a romance between him and Susan.

Despite these successes, Duffy forgets to talk to Susan. This results in her growing angry when she discovers that both of her children have neglected her instructions to stay at home and help her with baking cheese puffs and are instead at Phil's house baking cheese puffs. This causes a rift between Phil and Susan that is only mended after Duffy is hit by a speeding car and they must pair together with their children to find his magic collar. They find the collar and quickly bring it back to Duffy, saving his life in the process.

Cast
 Johnny Whitaker as Phil Barber
 Kristine DeBell as Susan
 Justin Cone as Chris Barber
 Janis Peebles as Tina
 Alison Sieke as Frannie
 Ed Roll as Archibald Kent
 Sylvester Granular as Sgt. Mahew
 Daniel Dannas as Trent
 Eric Roberts as Duffy (voice)

Production
The film is one of several direct-to-video family films directed by David DeCoteau under the pseudonym Mary Crawford. It was shot in three days in the same mansion as director DeCoteau's 1313 series. Eric Roberts' dialogue was recorded in 15 minutes over a phone call.

Reception
Critical reception was predominantly negative, with Film.com criticizing the character of Duffy and the laziness of the special effects. The A.V. Club gave a mostly negative review for the film, but stated that "for lovers of utter, unredeemable trash, it is highly recommended." CraveOnline also gave a negative review, but also recommended it as a film for "Bad Movie Night".

In his book So Bad, It's Good II: Electric Bookaloo, Edward Scimia writes of Roberts' performance that "It's safe to call his delivery of the cat's lines disinterested. [...] There's also the puzzling audio quality of his material: it clearly stands out from the rest of the film, with many remarking that it sounds as though he recorded his lines in a bathroom." He sums up the movie with "In the end, Duffy uses his demonic powers for good, helping to [...] teach several cast members valuable lessons about...whatever. You don't really care. It's a terrible movie about a talking cat."

In an interview, DeCoteau said of the film that "people have called me who I haven't seen since high school who said, 'David, after 100 movies you've finally made a movie we like.'" He added, "I watched it again, because I hadn't seen it since we made it, and it is so ridiculous and hilarious and over-the-top."

YouTuber JonTron also uploaded a video reviewing the film, commenting on the poor script and editing quality. The video has over 15 million views as of January 2023.

It was also spoofed by RiffTrax on June 26, 2018.

See also 
 Cats & Dogs 
 Air Buddies
 Beverly Hills Chihuahua
 Nine Lives - 2016 family film similar in content
 List of films considered the worst
 Gougère

References

External links
 
 
 
 RiffTrax version on official YouTube channel

2013 films
American children's comedy films
Direct-to-video comedy films
Films about cats
Films directed by David DeCoteau
Films scored by Harry Manfredini
Talking animals in fiction
2010s English-language films
2010s American films